The TAV (meaning high speed train) is  Brazil's first planned high-speed rail service. The first line is proposed to run between Rio de Janeiro and São Paulo.

The entire TAV project was originally budgeted at $231 billion, supported by private and international investors, not the government. There have been several attempts to finance and launch the project, but construction has not started.

Project history 

A feasibility study projected a demand of almost 33 million passengers by 2015. This estimate however is highly criticized for being too generous.

The plans include linking the São Paulo International Airport, in Guarulhos, Greater São Paulo, the Viracopos International Airport, in Campinas, and the Galeão International Airport, in Rio de Janeiro. The route will include 134 km (85 mi) of track passing through 105 tunnels and viaducts. In Guarulhos, São Paulo, there will be a tunnel of 15 km (9.3 mi) in length.

Apart from the Inter-American Development Bank, five other international institutions have already tabled the possibility of investing in the Brazilian super train. BNDES, in particular, has proposed financing the project. An estimated 200,000 jobs are expected to be generated by the project once it gets underway.

The winning bidders will join the government as venture partners through a public company, called ETAV. In July 2000, the CND (National Council for Privatization), following the ruling of the TCU (Court of Audit), authorized the release of the feasibility study for the project.

The consortium that won the bidding for the high-speed train will, according to the original plan, have six years to complete the stretch between Rio and Campinas. According to ANTT (National Agency of Land Transport), however, the winning bidder could complete certain stretches ready for operation beforehand. It was hoped that the complete linkage between Campinas to Rio, via São Paulo, would be complete and in operation for the 2016 Summer Olympics but, due to delays, the project was expected to be completed by 2020. Due to the coronavirus pandemic, the project has been delayed and is now expected to be completed in 2029. 

The ETAV, with headquarters in Brasília, aims to plan and promote the development of high-speed rail integrated with other modes of transportation in the country. ETAV's assignments include: feasibility studies, technical-economic engineering, research, innovation and technology, absorb and transfer technology, supporting capacity development of national industry, overseeing the execution of the works of infrastructure and the implementation of the operation of transport high-speed railway. The new company will be organized in the form of a privately held corporation and has its capital represented by common shares - of which at least 50% will be owned by a Union.

Traffic Distribution 
In planning the basic services of TAV Brazil, the times of the highest flow of passengers daily, weekly and annually were taken into consideration.
 For Express Service (Direct operation between São Paulo and Rio): 35% of daily traffic is estimated to be concentrated in three hours during the morning peak (6:00 am to 9:00 am) and 35% in the three hours of the afternoon peak (5:00 pm to 8:00 pm);
 For Regional services the route between Campinas and São José dos Campos, with a stop in São Paulo, is considered a short distance. From Campinas to Rio de Janeiro, with a stop in São Paulo, São José dos Campos, Volta Redonda and Barra Mansa is considered long distance. 25% of daily traffic is concentrated at the peak of the morning (6:00 am to 9:00 am) while 25% is concentrated in the afternoon peak hours (5:00 pm to 8:00 pm) and 20% during the peak midday hours of (noon to 2:00 pm).

The distribution of traffic is estimated to be 16.3% for each weekday, 7.7% on Saturdays, and 10.8% on Sundays. The total annual traffic is based on the weekly total, assuming 52 weeks per year.

The total number of high-speed trains will be 14 express trains, 25 regional trains, and 3 reserve trains. By 2024, the total number of high-speed trains is expected to be 28 express trains, 50 regional trains, and 6 reserve trains.

TAV Brazil favors the reduction of distance between the cities of São Paulo and Rio de Janeiro and estimates that the rail service will be reduced to less than half -measured in minutes. 93 minutes by TAV, 110 minutes by airplane, 3 minutes by car, and 9 minutes by bus. 

The high-speed train will be divided into two classes, economy class and executive class. Among passengers who fly between São Paulo-Rio, 77% do so for work and 23% do so for non-work related journeys. The axis formed by the cities of Rio de Janeiro, São Paulo and Campinas is the most important in the country. It involves 33% of the gross domestic product and affects 20% of the population of Brazil.

Railroad Specification 
The parameters of the planned railroad are: Gauge: ; Maximum Projected Speed: 350 km/h; Maximum Gradient (gradient) of the project: 3.5%; Minimum Horizontal Radius: 7228 m; Minimum Vertical Radius: 42.875 m; Axle Load per Train: 17 t; Crossing Loop/Minimum Platform Length at Each Station: 500 m/400 m (for train sets up to 16 cars).
The extension and their paths are divided by 90.9 km or 56.4 mi (18%) of Tunnel, 107.8 km or 66.9 mi (21%) of bridges and viaducts, and 312.1 km or 193.9 mi (61%) of surface.

This has taken longer that originally anticipated. For a timeline,  Updated Information

TAV by Route

TAV Campinas/São Paulo/Rio 

The first planned line will link the Brazilian cities of São Paulo and Rio de Janeiro. There will be seven stations on the route, including the cities of Campinas, Jundiaí, São José dos Campos, and Aparecida in the State of São Paulo and the cities of Resende, Barra Mansa in the state of State of Rio de Janeiro. The project will include the main airports of Campinas, São Paulo, and Rio.

Tickets are estimated to cost R$200 one way. A one-way ticket from São Paulo to Rio currently costs between R$52.00 (by bus) to R$72. Travel in executive coaches is currently estimated to cost R$60.

TAV Brasília/Goiânia 

In 2009, construction of the TAV High-speed railway between Brasília/Anápolis/Goiânia was announced, known as the Expresso Pequi.

TAV Belo Horizonte/Curitiba 
In 2008, when the plans for implementing high-speed trains connecting the country's megalopolises was announced, the government of Brazil included by Provisional Measure - the rail link for passengers between the cities of Belo Horizonte and Curitiba - in the National Transportation Plan. The plan lists the investments that may be made by the government in the transportation sector. After completion of the auction of the Rio-São Paulo route, the Brazilian government will begin studying the connection of the capital of Minas Gerais, and the capital of Paraná. This railway line would connect - in the State of Minas Gerais the cities of; Belo Horizonte, Divinópolis, Varginha and Poços de Caldas, in the State of São Paulo; Campinas, São Paulo, Sorocaba, Itapetininga and Apiaí, and, in the State of Paraná; Curitiba.

TAV Ribeirão Preto/Uberlândia 
There are also plans for a high-speed railway between Uberlândia and Ribeirão Preto, which will be funded by the federal government.

See also 
 List of high-speed railway lines
 Trens Intercidades

References

External links 
 TAV – Trem de Alta Velocidade 

 

es:Tren de Alta Velocidad de Brasil